Hovertank may refer to:
 Military hovercraft
 Hovercraft tank, a Soviet military project
 Hovertank 3D, a 1991 vehicular combat and first-person shooter game